Vineae Domini custodes is a papal bull issued by Pope Honorius III on June 1225 granting two Dominican friars, Dominic of Segovia and Martin, authorisation for a mission to Morocco. Honorius reissued the bull in October, this time calling on the Dominicans and Franciscans to join the Moroccan mission. He also ordered Archbishop Rodrigo Jiménez de Rada to send Dominican and Franciscan friars to undertake conversions by preaching and to appoint one of the friars as Bishop of Morocco.

Notes

13th-century papal bulls
Documents of Pope Honorius III